Žaliakalnis Funicular (English: Green Hill Funicular) is a funicular railway in Kaunas, Lithuania. Built in 1931, it is the oldest funicular in Lithuania and is among the oldest vehicles of such type in the world still operational. The funicular is made of a wood-paneled coachwork and climbs  up from behind the Vytautas the Great War Museum to the Basilica of the Resurrection.

It was constructed by engineering firm Curt Rudolph Transportanlagen from Dresden, Germany with electrical equipment from AEG and mechanical parts from Bell Maschinenfabrik, Switzerland. The official opening was on 5 August 1931 with one passenger car, while the second car was only a platform ballasted with stones used to counterbalance the passenger car. The electric overhead power cable and the pantographs of the coaches are only used for lighting and heating of the cars. The upper station housed the electrically driven funicular mechanism in the basement, whilst the lower end of the line did not even have a shelter until 1932.

The funicular succeeded and became very popular transportation for the city inhabitants and guests. It is known that about 5 million passengers were moved using it between 1950 and 1970.

The funicular was renovated between 1935 and 1937. New, larger cars with car bodies from Napoleonas Dobkevičius on underframes from Bell Maschinenfabrik were built, and the lower station was given a proper building. 

The Žaliakalnis Funicular Railway was included in the Registry of Immovable Cultural Heritage Sites of the Republic of Lithuania in 1993.

In 2015, the funicular was one of 44 objects in Kaunas to receive the European Heritage Label.

See also
 Aleksotas Funicular Railway completed in Kaunas in 1935
 List of funicular railways

References

1931 establishments in Lithuania
Transport in Kaunas
Buildings and structures in Kaunas
Funicular railways in Lithuania
1520 mm gauge railways in Lithuania
Tourist attractions in Kaunas
Heritage railways